The 1999 WCHA Men's Ice Hockey Tournament was the 40th conference playoff in league history and 47th season where a WCHA champion was crowned. The 1999 tournament played between March 12 and March 20, 1999, at five conference arenas and the Target Center in Minneapolis, Minnesota. By winning the tournament, Denver was awarded the Broadmoor Trophy and received the Western Collegiate Hockey Association's automatic bid to the 1999 NCAA Men's Division I Ice Hockey Tournament.

Format
The first round of the postseason tournament featured a best-of-three games format. All nine conference teams participated in the tournament as did Mankato State which was slated to join the WCHA as a full member the following year. Teams were seeded No. 1 through No. 9 according to their final conference standing, with a tiebreaker system used to seed teams with an identical number of points accumulated while Mankato State was seeded tenth. The top five seeded teams each earned home ice and hosted one of the lower seeded teams.

The winners of the first round series advanced to the Target Center for the WCHA Final Five, the collective name for the quarterfinal, semifinal, and championship rounds. The Final Five uses a single-elimination format. Teams were re-seeded No. 1 through No. 5 according to the final regular season conference standings, with the top three teams automatically advancing to the semifinals.

Conference standings
Note: GP = Games played; W = Wins; L = Losses; T = Ties; PTS = Points; GF = Goals For; GA = Goals Against

Bracket
Teams are reseeded after the first round

Note: * denotes overtime period(s)

First round

(1) North Dakota vs. (10) Mankato State

(2) Colorado College vs. (9) Minnesota-Duluth

(3) Denver vs. (8) Michigan Tech

(4) Wisconsin vs. (7) St. Cloud State

(5) Minnesota vs. (6) Alaska-Anchorage

Quarterfinal

(5) Minnesota vs. (7) St. Cloud State

Semifinals

(1) North Dakota vs. (5) Minnesota

(2) Colorado College vs. (3) Denver

Third Place

(2) Colorado College vs. (5) Minnesota

Championship

(1) North Dakota vs. (3) Denver

Tournament awards

All-Tournament Team
F Justin Morrison (Colorado College)
F Jeff Panzer (North Dakota)
F Paul Veres (Denver)
D Erik Westrum (Minnesota)
D Joe Ritson (Denver)
G Stephen Wagner* (Denver)
* Most Valuable Player(s)

See also
Western Collegiate Hockey Association men's champions

References

External links
WCHA.com
1998–99 WCHA Standings
1998–99 NCAA Standings

WCHA Men's Ice Hockey Tournament
Wcha Men's Ice Hockey Tournament